Nicolas Kazadi (born 7 January 1966) is a Congolese politician and career diplomat who has been Ambassador-at-large for the Democratic Republic of the Congo since 7 March 2019 and Minister of Finance since 12 April 2021.

He is a member of the presidential party Union for Democracy and Social Progress (UDPS), the oldest and largest opposition party since President Mobutu cancelled the multi-party system upon his rise to power in 1965.

Education 
Kazadi started his university studies at the University of Kinshasa, but transferred to Marien Ngouabi University in neighboring Brazzaville a year later, which is where he graduated with a Bachelor's degree in development planning. He continued his studies in France, where he attended the University of Reims Champagne-Ardenne, obtaining his first Master's degree in Macroeconomics. Kazadi went on to further his studies at the University of Paris I, Pantheon-Sorbonne, and obtained a Master's in Economic Regulation and Development Policies.

In 1998, after having kickstarted his professional career at the Central Bank of Congo and the Ministry of Finance for the seven preceding years, Nicolas Kazadi returned to France to attend the prestigious École Nationale d'Administration. As part of the Averroès promotion (1998–2000), he graduated alongside multiple prominent French political figures such as Alexis Kohler, current secretary general of the French presidency l'Élysée, as well as Fleur Pellerin, former French Minister of Culture and Communication, or again Audrey Azoulay, former French Minister of Culture and current Director-General of the United Nations Educational, Scientific and Cultural Organization (UNESCO).

Return to Zaïre and first career in Congolese government 
In 1991, Nicolas Kazadi returned to the then Zaïre, starting a career at the Central Bank of Zaïre until transferring to the Ministry of Finance in 1995, as the economic and financial advisor to the minister. It is at the Ministry of Finance that Kazadi is introduced to his colleague Vital Kamerhe, with whom he would work again years later as part of the Presidency of the Democratic Republic of the Congo under President Tshisekedi.

In 1997, Kazadi returned to the new Central Bank of Congo (renamed upon Mobutu's ousting from power) until 1998, the year he returned to France to study at the École Nationale d'Administration. During his second stint at the Central Bank, he was a member of the team in charge of developing and releasing the Zairean zaïre's replacement, the Congolese franc.

In 2001, he returned to Congo and served as Managing Director of the French Chamber of Commerce and Industry in Kinshasa.

Diplomatic career 
In January 2002, Kazadi left Congo once again and joined the African Development Bank's headquarters in Abidjan, where he served as advisor and acting alternate executive director, representing the Democratic Republic of the Congo, Cameroon, Congo, Burundi and the Central African Republic.

A year and a half later, although remaining in an intergovernmental organization, Nicolas Kazadi joined the United Nations Development Programme and served as a senior economist and chief of the strategic and policy units in Madagascar, Guinea, Ivory Coast and Togo over a period of 15 years.

End of diplomatic career and return to Congolese government 
A long time member of the current Presidential party and advisor to its late founder Étienne Tshisekedi, Nicolas Kazadi left his diplomatic career at the United Nations in December 2018, month of the Congolese Presidential elections, to join the candidate Félix Tshisekedi in Kinshasa. A month and a half after having been elected President of the Democratic Republic of the Congo, Félix Tshisekedi named him Ambassador-at-large on 7 March 2019. 

Kazadi was named Minister of Finance on 12 April 2021 and assumed office on 28 April 2021

References 

1966 births
Living people
Luba people
People from Kinshasa
Marien Ngouabi University alumni
École nationale d'administration alumni